Ananda: Rise of Notra is a 2019 Burmese science-fiction film, directed by Nyo Min Lwin starring Nan Su Oo, Phyo Ngwe Soe, Sai Hlwan, Soe Yan Aung, Thar Nyi, Akari Hmou Paing and Thet Htar Wai Zin. It was produced by Night School Production and premiered in Myanmar on July 4, 2019.

Synopsis
Depending on the time and circumstances, nations may choose to live in a variety of new planets for their comfort. However, everyone's mutual goal is to reunite people who have been separated by unfortunate circumstances. The key to the reunification of all human beings is to explore a whole new world with the same function as the previous one.

Cast
Nan Su Oo as Dee Tah
Phyo Ngwe Soe as Captain Lagoon
Sai Hlwan as Major Agga
Soe Yan Aung as Over
Thar Nyi as Commander Saw Waldo
Akari Hmou Paing as Captain Charcoal
Thet Htar Wai Zin as Notra

References

2019 films
2010s Burmese-language films
Burmese science fiction films
Films shot in Myanmar